Ipswich TMD is a traction maintenance depot located in Ipswich, Suffolk, England. The depot is situated on the Great Eastern Main Line and is near Ipswich station.

The depot code is IP.

Allocation 
As of 2016, the depot's allocation consists of Greater Anglia Class 321 EMUs.

See also
Ipswich engine shed

References 

Rail transport in Suffolk
Railway depots in England